Goring may refer to:

Places in England 
 Goring Gap, geological feature on the River Thames near Reading, England
Goring Heath, village and parish, Oxfordshire
Goring-on-Thames, village and parish, Oxfordshire
Goring Lock, a lock and weir on the River Thames in Oxfordshire, England
Goring-by-Sea, West Sussex
Goring (electoral division), an electoral division in West Sussex which contains Goring-by-Sea

Other uses 
 Goring, an injury caused by an animal horn or tusk, an especial hazard in bullfighting
 Goring (surname)
 Göring Gambit, a chess opening
 Goring Hotel, 5-star hotel in London
 Lord Goring, a fictional character in Oscar Wilde's 1895 play An Ideal Husband
 Typhoon Goring (disambiguation)

See also 
 Göring (disambiguation)
 Gore (disambiguation)